Ark is the second solo album by Brendan Perry, the male half of the band Dead Can Dance. It was Perry's first studio album in 11 years. It was first made available to the public as part of a limited 2,000-copy autographed pre-release offered at a concert in Prague on 31 March 2010 and subsequent shows. It was officially released worldwide by Cooking Vinyl on 7 June 2010.

Track listing

Personnel
Musical
 Brendan Perry – writer, composer, performer

Technical
 Mastered by Aidan Foley at Masterlabs

Graphical
 Sleeve design by Graham Wood
 Photography (front cover) by Dan Van Winkle
 Photography (inner cover) by Sophia Wood

Charts

References

External links
 Ark at Brendan-Perry.com
 Ark at dead-can-dance.com
 
 

2010 albums
Brendan Perry albums
Cooking Vinyl albums